Margaret Palaeologa (11 August 1510 in Casale Monferrato – 28 December 1566 in Mantua), was the ruling Marquise regnant of Montferrat in her own right between 1533 and 1536. She was also Duchess of Mantua by marriage to Federico II, Duke of Mantua. Margaret acted as the regent of the Duchy of Mantua twice during the minority of her sons: for her elder son Francesco III Gonzaga, Duke of Mantua in 1540-1549, and for her younger son Guglielmo Gonzaga, Duke of Mantua, between 1550 and 1556.

Early life 

Margaret was born in Casale to William IX of Montferrat and his wife Anne of Alençon.  

Margaret was the second of three children. Her elder sister was Maria Paleologa, who died when she was 21 years of age, and her younger brother was Boniface IV of Montferrat, who died when he was only 18 years of age.

Marriage 

In 1517, Margaret's elder sister, Maria, was betrothed to Federico II Gonzaga, son of Francesco II Gonzaga and Isabella d'Este, who later became Marquis and Duke of Mantua. The marriage contract was annulled. Federico's attentions turned to Margaret. Having weighed up the various proposals for Margaret's hand, her mother Anne d'Alençon opted for the link with the House of Gonzaga and the marriage was concluded in October 1531. The marriage lasted for nine years until Federico's death, at the age of 40. The couple's last child was born the year of his death. 

In 1533, Margaret inherited the title Marquise of Montferrat from her uncle John George, Marquis of Montferrat. However, in practice her ream was under Spanish occupation at the time.  In 1536, her husband was made ruling Marquis of Montferrat by right of his marriage to her.

Regent of Mantua 

On Federico's death in 1540, their eldest son, Francesco became Duke of Mantua as well as Marquis of Montferrat. As Francesco was still only a minor aged eight, Margaret acted as his regent. 

Margaret had her son married to Catherine, daughter of Ferdinand I, Holy Roman Emperor and Anna of Bohemia and Hungary. Margaret had her second son, Guglielmo married to Catherine's younger sister, Eleanor.
Francesco died one year after his marriage to Catherine in 1550, and no children were born to their union. 

Margaret's second son Guglielmo then became Duke of Mantua. Margaret acted as his regent, with the help of her brother-in-law Cardinal Ercole Gonzaga. 
As regent, Margaret issued laws and regulations which benefitted the economy of Mantua by the establishment of businesses. She made improvements on the river harbour and had the fortifications and defense of the Duchy strengthened. In her foreign policy, she was Pro-Spanish, which caused the French king to occupy Montferrat in 1555 - it was to be held by France until the Treaty of Cambresis in 1559.  

Her regency was terminated when her son came of age in 1556. 

Margaret died in Mantua on 28 December 1566.

In 1574, Margaret's homeland of Montferrat became part of the Duchy of Mantua, after the death of Margaret's son. In Montferrat, Guglielmo was known as Guglielmo X.

Issue
Margaret and Federico had:
 Francesco III Gonzaga, Duke of Mantua (March 10, 1533 - February 22, 1550), died 16 years old.
 Eleonora Gonzaga, born and died in 1535.
 Anna Gonzaga, born and died in 1536.
 Isabella Gonzaga (1537-1579). Married Francesco Ferdinando d'Ávalos.
 Guglielmo Gonzaga, Duke of Mantua (April 24, 1538 - August 14, 1587). Married Archduchess Eleanor of Austria
 Louis Gonzaga, Duke of Nevers (October 22, 1539 - October 23, 1595). Married Henriette of Cleves, by whom he had issue, including Charles I, Duke of Mantua.
 Cardinal Federico Gonzaga (1540 - February 21, 1565)

Ancestry

References

Sources

1510 births
1566 deaths
House of Gonzaga
Regents of Mantua
Female regents
People from Casale Monferrato
Marquesses of Montferrat
Margaret
Duchesses of Mantua
16th-century women rulers
Burials in the Church of Santa Paola, Mantua
16th-century Italian women